Cianjhen Senior High School is a station on the Red line of Kaohsiung MRT in Cianjhen District, Kaohsiung, Taiwan. It will be a future transfer station with the Yellow line.

The station is a two-level, underground station with an island platform and three exits. It is 199 meters long and is located at the intersection of Jhongshan 4th Rd., Wujia 3rd Rd. and Jhenjhong Rd.

Around the station
 Chienchen River
 Kaohsiung Municipal Cianjhen Senior High School
 Kaohsiung City Government Labor Affairs Bureau
 Cianjhen District Administrative Center
 Fucheng Senior High School

References

2008 establishments in Taiwan
Kaohsiung Metro Red line stations
Railway stations opened in 2008